Raj Mahal is the palace of the erstwhile Maharaja of Jaipur in Jaipur, Rajasthan.

History 
The original construction dates back to 1729 and was renovated and changed over time. In 1821 it became the official residence of the British resident of Rajputana. It was renovated into the Art Deco style. After independence in 1958 Maharaja Sawai Man Singh II made it into his private residence.

Visitors included Queen Elizabeth II and The Duke of Edinburgh, Jackie Kennedy, the Shah of Iran, Lord Mountbatten and Lady Mountbatten, Charles, Prince of Wales and Princess Diana.

Interior designer Adil Ahmad was commissioned to restore the palace as it was converted into a luxury hotel.

See also  
 City Palace, Jaipur 
 Rambagh Palace

References

External links 

 SUJÁN Rajmahal Palace | Boutique Luxury Palace Hotel | Jaipur, Rajasthan, India

Art Deco architecture in India
Heritage hotels in India
Hotels in Jaipur
Palaces in Jaipur
Royal residences in India
Tourist attractions in Jaipur
Rajput architecture